Piramida may refer to:
 Piramida, a former museum in Tirana, Albania
 Pyramiden, an abandoned Russian coal mining community on Svalbard, Norway
 Piramida (album), the fourth studio album by Danish band Efterklang

See also
 Pyramid (disambiguation)